Tabish Oza  is a Pakistani fashion model. Started his career in 2011 he has established himself as one of the leading models working with well-known brands and designers. He received his first nomination at lux style awards 2014 as best emerging talent in fashion and at  3rd Hum Awards as Best Model Male.

Career
Tabish was born on August 14, 1990 in Lahore to Muslim parents and holds a double MBA in Finance and Marketing. He started his career in 2011 after winning a fashion week hunt, recalling: "I entered the field of fashion during the end of 2011 by winning the Bridal Couture Week model hunt among 300 guys. It was a dream start for me because that didn’t only give me a chance to go for Bridal Couture Week Lahore but also showered tons of shoots." He has since work with many fashion designers and brands specially, Bonanza, Shoe Planet, Gul Ahmed Group etc. He regularly appears in PFDC Sunsilk Fashion Week and Pakistan Fashion Weeks every year.

Awards and nominations

References

External links
 

Living people
1989 births
People from Lahore
Pakistani male models